Majzoob is a follower in Sufism.

Majzoob or Majzoub or Majdoub or Mejdub may refer to:
Abderrahman El Majdoub, is a Moroccan Sufi.
Mahmoud al-Majzoub, is a Palestinian leader.
Muhammad El Majzoub, is a Syrian singer.
Ramzi Majdoub, is a Tunisian handball player.
Tarek Majzoub, is a Lebanese politician.